Stojan Steve Tesich (September 29, 1942 – July 1, 1996) was a Serbian-American screenwriter, playwright, and novelist. He won the Academy Award for Best Original Screenplay in 1979 for the film Breaking Away. Tesich is also credited as the inventor of the term "post-truth".

Early life
Steve Tesich was born as Stojan Tešić (pronounced TESH-ich) in Užice, in Axis-occupied Yugoslavia (now Serbia) on September 29, 1942. He immigrated to the United States with his mother and sister when he was 14 years old. His family settled in East Chicago, Indiana. His father died in 1962.

Tesich graduated from Indiana University in 1965 with a BA in Russian. He was a member of Phi Kappa Psi fraternity. He went on to do graduate work at Columbia University, receiving an MA in Russian Literature in 1967.

After graduation, he worked as a Department of Welfare caseworker in Brooklyn, New York in 1968.

Career
In the 1970s, he wrote a series of plays that were staged at The American Place Theatre in New York City. The first of these plays, The Carpenters, premiered during the 1970-1971 season. Baba Goya made its debut at the theater in May 1973; the cast included Olympia Dukakis and John Randolph. Later that year, the play was staged at the Cherry Lane Theatre under a different name (Nourish the Beast).

The play The Carpenters starring Vincent Gardenia and Joseph Hindy, presented on the Hollywood Television Theatre's Conflicts series, was shown on PBS on December 19, 1973 in a telecast from 8:30-9:30 PM EST. The theme of the play was the disintegration of an American family divided by the generation gap.

John Randolph, Eileen Brennan, and John Beck starred in the comedy Nourish the Beast on PBS on Thursday, February 12, 1974, also presented as part of the Hollywood Television Theatre's Conflicts series.

Tesich's screenplay for Breaking Away (1979) had its origins in his college years. He had been an alternate rider in 1962 for the Phi Kappa Psi team in the Little 500 bicycle race. Teammate Dave Blase rode 139 of 200 laps and was the victory rider crossing the finish line for his team. They subsequently developed a friendship. Blase became the model for the main character in Breaking Away. The film was a hit, and Tesich won the Academy Award for Best Original Screenplay. He also created a short-lived TV series of the same name.

His play Division Street opened at the Ambassador Theatre in New York City on October 8, 1980. The production starred John Lithgow and Keene Curtis. It closed after 21 performances. The play was revived in 1987 at the Second Stage, with Saul Rubinek in the lead role.

Tesich reunited with Peter Yates, the director of Breaking Away, on the 1981 thriller Eyewitness starring Sigourney Weaver, William Hurt, Morgan Freeman, and Christopher Plummer.

His next screenplay was for the semi-autobiographical film Four Friends which was directed by Arthur Penn which covered the activism and turbulence of the 1960s. Vincent Canby of the New York Times wrote in his review: "For Mr. Tesich, it is another original work by one of our best young screenwriters." Roger Ebert wrote in the Chicago Sun-Times that it was "a very good movie."

He adapted John Irving's novel The World According to Garp for the screen in 1982 directed by George Roy Hill and starring Robin Williams and Glenn Close in her film debut. The best-selling novel had been described as unfilmable. The screenplay was nominated for Best Drama Adapted from Another Medium by the Writers Guild of America (WGA) in 1983.

Tesich returned to the sport of cycling with the screenplay for American Flyers (1985). The main characters were two brothers, played by Kevin Costner and David Marshall Grant, who enter a long-distance bicycle race in the Colorado Rockies.

His final screenplay was for the 1985 film Eleni starring John Malkovich, Kate Nelligan, and Linda Hunt, based on the Nicholas Gage book also directed by Peter Yates.

His novel Karoo was published posthumously in 1998. Arthur Miller described the novel: "Fascinating—a real satiric invention full of wise outrage." The novel was a New York Times Notable Book for 1998. The novel also appeared in a German translation as Abspann, and it was also translated in France in 2012 where it was acclaimed by the critics and became a best-seller.

Oxford Dictionaries credits Tesich with the first use of the term "post-truth," which Oxford defined as "circumstances in which objective facts are less influential in shaping public opinion than appeals to emotion and personal belief." Ralph Keyes, author of The Post-Truth Era (2004), also says he first saw the term "in a 1992 Nation essay by the late Steve Tesich." Post-truth was Oxford's 2016 Word of the Year.

Death
Tesich died in Sydney, Nova Scotia, Canada on July 1, 1996, following a heart attack. He was 53 years old.

Honors and awards
In 1973, Tesich won the Drama Desk Award for Most Promising Playwright for the play Baba Goya, which is also known under the title Nourish the Beast.

Tesich won the following awards for the Breaking Away screenplay in 1979, whose original working title was Bambino:

 Academy Award, Best Original Screenplay
 National Society of Film Critics Award, Best Screenplay
 New York Film Critics Circle Award, Best Screenplay
 Writers Guild of America Award, Best-Written Comedy Written Directly for the Screen
 Screenwriter of the Year, ALFS Award from the London Critics Circle Film Awards, 1981

He also received a nomination in 1980 for a Golden Globe for Best Screenplay-Motion Picture.

In 2005, the Ministry of Religion and Diaspora established the annual Stojan—Steve Tešić Award, to be awarded to the writers of Serbian origin that write in other languages.

Screenplays

Film
Breaking Away (1979)
Eyewitness (1981)
Four Friends (1981)
The World According to Garp (1982)
American Flyers (1985)
Eleni (1985)

Television
 The Carpenters, play for television, 1973
 Nourish the Beast, play for television, 1974
 Apple Pie, television series, 1978
 Breaking Away, television series, 1980-1981

Plays
The Carpenters, 1970
Lake of the Woods, 1971
Nourish the Beast, also performed under the title Baba Goya, 1973
Gorky, 1975
Passing Game, 1977
Touching Bottom, 1978
Division Street, 1980
The Speed Of Darkness, 1989
Square One, 1990
The Road, 1990
Baptismal, 1990
On the Open Road, 1992
Arts & Leisure, 1996

Novels
Summer Crossing (1982), was also published in a German translation as  Ein letzter Sommer and in a French translation as Price
Karoo (1996, posthumously released 1998), paperback edition in 2004 with new introduction by E. L. Doctorow; German-language version entitled Abspann and a French-language version Karoo same as original.

Collections
Division Street & other plays. New York: Performing Arts Journal Publications, 1981. 171 pages. Contents:  Division Street -- Baba Goya -- Lake of the Woods -- Passing Game.

References

External links

A Few Moments with Steve Tesich by Dejan Stojanović

1942 births
1996 deaths
Yugoslav emigrants to the United States
Writers from Indiana
Best Original Screenplay Academy Award winners
Indiana University alumni
Columbia Graduate School of Arts and Sciences alumni
20th-century screenwriters